Atagema echinata is a species of sea slug or dorid nudibranch, a marine gastropod mollusc in the family Discodorididae.

Distribution 
This species was described from the Hawaiian Islands. It has also been reported from the Mariana Islands.

References

Discodorididae
Gastropods described in 1860